The Grandmaster (En Dwi Gast) is a fictional character appearing in American comic books published by Marvel Comics. The character first appeared in The Avengers #69. The Grandmaster is one of the ageless Elders of the Universe and has mastered most civilizations' games of skill and chance. Different media appearances depict him as the Collector's brother.

Jeff Goldblum portrays the character in the Marvel Cinematic Universe film Thor: Ragnarok (2017) and in a cameo during the closing credits of Guardians of the Galaxy Vol. 2 (2017). Additionally, Goldblum voices alternate universe versions in the animated series What If...? (2021).

Publication history

The Grandmaster first appeared in The Avengers #69 (Oct. 1969). The character was created by Roy Thomas and Sal Buscema.

Fictional character biography
Although his exact origin is unknown, he is one of the oldest living beings in the universe, coming from one of the first intelligent races to evolve after the Big Bang. He once possessed the Mind Gem, one of the six Infinity Gems, but he lost it to Thanos. He is a cosmic game player whose preferred game is pitting two opposing teams against each other. He has used the Squadron Sinister, Daredevil, the Defenders, the East and West Coast Avengers, Malibu Comics's Ultraforce, and DC Comics' Justice League of America.

In his first appearance, the Grandmaster played a game against Kang the Conqueror for the power to resurrect Ravonna or destroy Kang's planet, using the Avengers and Squadron Sinister as pawns. However, Kang's efforts failed due to the intervention of the Black Knight meaning that the Avengers did not technically win their fight, causing Kang to sacrifice the power to resurrect Ravonna for the power to kill the Avengers, with this attempt failing again when the Grandmaster's gift literally gave Kang the power to kill only the Avengers rather than the currently-unaffiliated Black Knight. He next used the Defenders as pawns in a game against the Prime Mover.

The Grandmaster later challenged Death to a game of strategy, with the power to resurrect his fellow Elder the Collector as prize. A large collection of Earth heroes were used as pawns by both sides of the game; the Grandmaster promised that, if he won, he would never again use Earth's heroes as his pawns. The Grandmaster won, only to learn the resurrection power could only be used if someone else died in the resurrectee's place. Nonetheless, the Grandmaster felt the game would be incomplete unless the power was used, noting "Never, in a thousand games on a thousand worlds, have I quit the table ere the game was through!" Death suggested he use the heroes' lives instead, but, unwilling to break his promise to never again manipulate them, he instead sacrificed his own life to resurrect the Collector.

The Grandmaster returned from beyond his grave to plague the East and West Coast Avengers during one of their annual games of baseball, reasoning that, since he was dead, he was free from his vow to leave Earth's heroes in peace. After he and the Collector tricked the teams into battling each other, the Grandmaster succeeded in his true plan: to capture Lady Death and usurp her powers. He forced the Avengers to participate in a competition with the Legion of the Unliving in order to stop a series of powerful bombs, the fate being all of creation. Captain America and Hawkeye were the only two heroes to survive; the rest of the Avengers were slain, only to instantly join the Legion. As the Grandmaster was preparing to force the pair to fight the Legion again, Hawkeye convinced him to lay it all on the line with one last game of pure chance. Hawkeye held one arrow in each fist, the tips hidden in his hands. Grandmaster would win if he chose the one with Hawkeye's last arrowhead. The one he picked was headless (Hawkeye admits to Captain America that he had cheated: he quickly snapped off the arrowhead as the Grandmaster chose the correct arrow), and his distraction allowed Lady Death to escape her bonds and banish the Grandmaster from her realm — in other words, making them effectively immortal. As a reward, she returned the deceased Avengers to life. This incident is what led Death to ban the Elders from dying, confirmed by the Grandmaster in the issue's final panels, just before he expresses interest in the Avengers' renewed baseball game.

He and a group of ten other Elders then conspired to kill Galactus and restart the universe; they felt that being banned from Death's realm would make them the sole survivors to continue their obsessions in a whole new universe. The Grandmaster battled Galactus and the Silver Surfer, and was one of the five Elders captured and consumed by Galactus. The devoured Elders caused Galactus "cosmic indigestion" from within until they were forced out of him by Master Order and Lord Chaos. When the Silver Surfer asked the five Elders to aid them in helping Galactus to defeat the In-Betweener the Grandmaster refused because it would nullify a solemn wager the Elders had made so the Champion physically restrained him until the battle was over. Moments later, the five Elders used their Infinity Gems to instantaneously travel very far away from Galactus and his vengeance.

The Grandmaster traveled to the Ultraverse to collect the Infinity Gems that were in Loki's possession. Both decide to make a competition for the possession of gems, pitting the Avengers against Ultraforce. However both lost the gems to the entity Nemesis.

In 2004 the Grandmaster organized the meeting of the Avengers and the Justice League in an attempt to save the Marvel Universe from the DC Comics villain Krona, when Krona came to the Marvel Universe seeking answers about the origin of creation. In an attempt to save his universe, Grandmaster challenged Krona to a game for the identity of a being in the Marvel Universe who had lived through the Big Bang by pitting the Avengers and the JLA against each other in a 'scavenger hunt' for twelve items of power- with Krona choosing the Avengers as his team-, only for Krona to turn on the Grandmaster when he lost due to Captain America helping Batman gain the Cosmic Cube. Although Krona's anti-energy powers were able to easily defeat both the Grandmaster and Galactus, the Grandmaster revealed the game was a trick and was able to use the items gathered to merge the two universes and trap Krona in their 'junction point'. However Krona accelerated the process, with the intention of destroying both universes and learning their secrets. The Phantom Stranger guided the two teams to the Grandmaster, who showed them the truth of reality, then died. However the Grandmaster was restored to life when reality was returned to normal, and it was revealed he had been playing a game with the New God Metron.

The Grandmaster later recreated his Squadron Sinister, with new incarnations of members Doctor Spectrum and Hyperion, to contend against Baron Helmut Zemo's Thunderbolts. He has been using this Squadron to destroy several sources of extra-dimensional energy, known collectively as the "Universal Wellspring", apparently to prevent Zemo from controlling them. The Grandmaster was dispersed by Zemo in a battle for the final Wellspring. In Thunderbolts #108 he was restored and battled Zemo for control of Earth, however using all the power of Earth that had been loaned to him by Earth's superhumans, Zemo was able to take his powers away. Zemo then shot the Grandmaster in the head seemingly killing him.

The Grandmaster returns, promising the Hulk the revival of his long-lost love, Jarella (though this has been thought in the past to be beyond his powers), if he participates in a battle to the death with a team of his choice. The Hulk chooses Doctor Strange, Namor, and the Silver Surfer. However, the Grandmaster takes them from different points in time (specifically, moments when their greatest loves were lost to them), and sets them against a team gathered by the Collector called the Offenders (which is composed of Red Hulk, Baron Mordo, Tiger Shark, and Terrax). This again causes conflict with Galactus. Upon the conclusion of this battle the Grandmaster is apparently slain by the Red Hulk, and the Collector quits, simply leaving Hulk with Jarella's lifeless body.

The Grandmaster returns, with a more childish attitude. He has developed romantic feelings towards the X-Man heroine Dazzler. To that end, he stages a roller derby pitting her and two friends against dozens of super-villains. This angers Dazzler, because romance does not involve putting the person you care about in seemingly deadly danger.

Eight months after the "Secret Wars" storyline as part of the "All-New, All-Different Marvel," the Grandmaster competes against Collector on Battlerealm (a location which is made up of what's left of Battleworld) in a new Contest of Champions with the prize being an artifact called the Iso-Sphere.

During the "No Surrender" arc, Grandmaster forms his version of the Lethal Legion to go up against Challenger's Black Order in a contest that involves Pyramoids. It is later revealed that Voyager is Grandmaster's daughter who he used in his plans to claim the Pyramoids. His plan was finally defeated when Living Lightning confronted the Grandmaster and provoked him into a game of poker, with Santos subsequently raising the stakes of the game until he reached a point where the stakes were that the loser would have all memory of their accomplishments wiped from the memories of all who knew of them. Faced with this potential loss, the Grandmaster folded despite his ignorance of Santos's hand, as he could not bear to lose everything like that, whereas Santos accepted that being an Avenger meant doing the right thing because it was the right thing to do rather than because you would be remembered for it.

During the "Empyre" storyline, Grandmaster is revealed to have a sister called the Profiteer, another Elder of the Universe.

Powers and abilities
The Grandmaster has been described as manipulating the so-called "power primordial", radiation left over from the Big Bang, and is one of the most powerful Elders of the Universe. However, his power is considerably below that of Galactus and the In-Betweener. It has been implied that the Grandmaster can, and in some cases has, used highly advanced technology to augment his abilities and perform feats that might be normally beyond him. While the extent of this is unknown, it is known that the Grandmaster has access and mastery of technology far beyond human comprehension.

The Grandmaster possesses a cosmic life force which renders him virtually immortal, including immunity to aging, disease, poison, and imperviousness to conventional injury through regeneration of any damage. He can survive and travel in space unaided and without food, drink, or air. He can utilize his cosmic life force for a variety of effects, including levitation, the projection of blasts of cosmic energy, teleportation across space and time and alternate dimensions, adjusting his size, control time to interact with beings moving at superhuman speed, or transformation and rearrangement of matter on a planetary scale. Perhaps his most fearsome ability is his power over life and death. The Grandmaster can "will" the death of another being. It is unknown if he can will the death of another virtual immortal being. He can also "resurrect" another being no matter how badly injured or heal a person on the verge of death. He cannot resurrect another virtually immortal being powered by "cosmic life force" like himself or anyone who has died past a certain time point. Lastly, he can temporarily bestow these powers upon another being. Currently, due to his machinations against Death, he and the other Elders cannot die.

He has a highly developed superhuman intellect, with vast knowledge and comprehension of games and game theory far beyond present-day Earth, as well as encyclopedic knowledge of thousands of exotic games played throughout the universe. He can calculate diverse low information probabilities within a tenth of a second and remember countless rules and data. He also possesses certain extra-sensory abilities of mental perception beyond those currently known which enable him to sense things about his surroundings not detectable by normal senses, and maintains a psychic link with the highly advanced computers of his base world, which extend and enhance his mental abilities.

The Grandmaster has access to various exotic extraterrestrial devices as needed, including starships.

In other media

Television
 The Grandmaster appears in the Fantastic Four: World's Greatest Heroes episode "Contest of Champions", voiced by French Tickner.
 The Grandmaster appears in The Super Hero Squad Show episode "Whom Continuity Would Destroy", voiced by John O'Hurley.
 The Grandmaster appeared in the Ultimate Spider-Man episode "Contest of Champions", voiced by Jeff Bennett.
 The Grandmaster appears in the Guardians of the Galaxy episode "Take the Milano and Run", voiced by Jason Spisak.

Film
The Grandmaster briefly appears in Planet Hulk.

Marvel Cinematic Universe

The Grandmaster appears in media set in the Marvel Cinematic Universe (MCU), portrayed by Jeff Goldblum. This version is the ruler of the planet Sakaar. Unlike his appearance in the comics, he does not have blue skin; instead having a silvery blue stripe running down the center of his lower lip and chin similar to one sported by the MCU version of the Collector. According to Thor: Ragnarok director Taika Waititi, the character's skin was not made blue overall to not detract from Goldblum's personality by concealing his appearance and because Goldblum had already played a blue-colored character in the film Earth Girls Are Easy.
 The Grandmaster first appears in a cameo in a mid-credits scene for the live-action film Guardians of the Galaxy Vol. 2.
 The Grandmaster makes his first full appearance in the live-action film Thor: Ragnarok. After Thor ends up on Sakaar, Valkyrie captures him and brings him to the Grandmaster, who forces him to face his "Champion", the Hulk, in gladiatorial combat. However, the Grandmaster rigs the fight when he sees Thor gaining the upper hand. Thor, Hulk, and Valkyrie later escape in one of the Grandmaster's ships after instigating a rebellion amongst the gladiators. In the film's post-credits scene, the Grandmaster and his two handmaidens face a group of rebels in a dumping yard and congratulates them.
 Alternate timeline versions of the Grandmaster appear in the Disney+ animated series What If...?
 The Grandmaster was set to return in the live-action film Thor: Love and Thunder, but his scenes were cut.

Video games
 The Grandmaster appears in Marvel Super Hero Squad: The Infinity Gauntlet, voiced again by John O'Hurley. Wolverine and Iron Man end up competing on Grandmaster's game show in order to get the Soul Gem.
 The Grandmaster appears in Marvel Super Heroes 3D: The Grandmaster Challenge.
 The Grandmaster appears as a playable character in Lego Marvel's Avengers.
 While the Grandmaster was announced as a playable character for Marvel: Future Fight, he was not released in the associated update.
 The Grandmaster appears as a non-playable character in Marvel Contest of Champions.

References

External links
 Grandmaster at Marvel.com
 Marvel Directory: Grandmaster

Characters created by Sal Buscema
Characters created by Roy Thomas
Comics characters introduced in 1969
Elders of the Universe
Fictional characters who can change size
Fictional characters who can manipulate reality
Fictional characters who can manipulate time
Fictional characters with death or rebirth abilities
Fictional characters with dimensional travel abilities
Fictional characters with elemental transmutation abilities
Fictional characters with energy-manipulation abilities
Fictional characters with healing abilities
Fictional characters with immortality
Marvel Comics characters who can teleport
Marvel Comics characters who have mental powers
Marvel Comics characters with accelerated healing
Marvel Comics extraterrestrial supervillains
Marvel Comics film characters
Marvel Comics male supervillains
Marvel Comics telepaths
Villains in animated television series